Vladimiro Lenin Ilich Montesinos Torres (born 20 May 1945) is a former long-standing head of Peru's intelligence service, National Intelligence Service (SIN), under President Alberto Fujimori. In the year 2000, the infamous "Vladi-videos" came to light through the television: they were secret videos recorded by Montesinos that showed him bribing elected congressmen into leaving the opposition and joining the pro-Fujimori group of the Congress. The ensuing scandal caused Montesinos to flee the country and prompted Fujimori's resignation.

Subsequent investigations revealed Montesinos to be at the centre of a vast web of illegal activities, including embezzlement, graft, gunrunning, and drug trafficking. He has been tried, convicted and sentenced for numerous charges. Montesinos had strong connections with the Central Intelligence Agency (CIA) for over 25 years and was said to have received $10 million from the agency for his government's anti-terrorist activities, with international bank accounts possessed by Montesinos reportedly holding at least $270 million. Montesinos is a cousin of the incarcerated terrorist leader Óscar Ramírez Durand, a.k.a. "Feliciano", the leader of the Shining Path. He has been portrayed in the film Caiga quien caiga. 

Even after losing power and the resignation of Alberto Fujimori, Montesinos has still considerable influence in Peruvian politics by protecting several Fujimorist politicians, including Keiko Fujimori.

Early years and education
Vladimiro Montesinos was born in the city of Arequipa, the capital of the Arequipa Region in southern Peru. His parents were devout communists of Greek origin and named their son after Vladimir Lenin. In 1965, Montesinos graduated as a military cadet at the U.S. Army's School of the Americas in Panama. A year later, he graduated from the Chorrillos Military School, in Lima, Peru.

Career

Military career 
In 1973, during the leftist military junta of General Juan Velasco Alvarado, Montesinos became an artillery captain in the Peruvian army and was appointed to the role of aide to General Edgardo Mercado Jarrín, who served as both Prime Minister and Chief of the Armed Forces.

CIA contact
In 1974, political scientist Alfred Stepan of Yale University recommended to the US Embassy, Lima that Montesinos be given the International Visitor's Leader Grant, describing him as the "most theoretically sophisticated of young military officers in national security doctrine" and that he had "considerable leadership potential". The United States Department of State and the Central Intelligence Agency (CIA) then began its relationship with Montesinos. When the Velasco government fell in 1975, Montesinos was able to maintain his position in the military during the more conservative government of General Francisco Morales-Bermúdez.

From 5 September to 21 September 1976, Montesinos travelled to Washington, D.C. paid for by the United States government, meeting with multiple US officials; Robert Hawkins of the CIA's Office of Current Intelligence, Luigi R. Einaudi, policy-planning chief of the US State Department's Latin America division, Riordan Roett of Johns Hopkins University and Abraham Lowenthal of the University of Southern California were documented to have met with Montesinos. Such trips for foreign individuals provided by the United States were rare at the time and were only reserved for high-value recruits destined to carry out US interests.

Upon his return to Lima, he was arrested for having failed to obtain formal government permission to make the trip. In 1976, Major José Fernández Salvatteci of the Army Intelligence Service ( (SIE)) charged Montesinos with the crimes of spying and treason, accusing him of delivering military documents to the embassy of the United States in Lima. The documents included a list of weapons which Peru had purchased from the Soviet Union. The subsequent investigation revealed that top-secret documents had been found in his possession, and that he had photographed them and given copies to the US Central Intelligence Agency (CIA). Montesinos had travelled to the U.S. without authorization from army command, and had forged military documents to allow him to complete the trip without being detained. He visited several foreign institutions as an official representative of the Peruvian army, also without authorization. 

Montesinos was dishonorably discharged from the military and sentenced two years in the military prison at Bolivar Barracks in Pueblo Libre. This was a far less severe sentence than the customary death penalty that was the punishment for traitors during the military regime. United States Ambassador to Peru Robert William Dean contacted Minister of Foreign Affairs of Peru José de la Puente Radbill to pressure for Montesinos' release while the attorney representing the imprisoned army captain was asked to contact Einaudi. General Mercado then ordered the charges be dropped.

Years later, declassified US State Department documents revealed the reason for the CIA's interest in Montesinos. In the 1970s, Peru was governed by the only left-wing regime in South America, a continent dominated by right-wing governments. Locked in the Cold War with the Soviet Union and fearing its influence in the region, as well as that of the Communist government of Cuba, the US was seeking information about activities in Peru. Montesinos conjured up and told a story about potential attacks against Peru's southern rival, Chile, then ruled by dictator Augusto Pinochet, an ally of the U.S.

Attorney career
In February 1978, Montesinos was freed after two years in jail. He was given work by his cousin Sergio Cardenal Montesinos, a lawyer who persuaded him to pursue a degree in law. In April of the same year, Montesinos applied to the National University of San Marcos in Lima.  He received his law diploma only three months later, through fraudulent means. Book No. 24 of the University of San Marcos Office of Records, where Montesinos' graduation would be noted, has disappeared from the Office. Montesinos' undergraduate thesis and other materials related to his academic record have never been produced.

On August 15, 1978, Montesinos used his degree to register as a lawyer with the Superior Court of Lima. Ten days later, on August 25, 1978, he became a member of the Lima bar association. He became notorious for representing a number of Colombian and Peruvian members of the illegal drug trade, as well as police officers accused of being involved in drug trafficking. Between 1978 and 1979, he represented Colombian drug lords Evaristo "Papá Doc" Porras Ardila and Jaime Tamayo. In addition, he acted as guarantor on Tamayo's lease of several offices and warehouses used to manufacture cocaine.

Between 1980 and 1983, Montesinos revealed sensitive information related to military wiretapping and assassinations to the newspaper Kausachum, run by Augusto Zimmerman, ex-spokesperson of deposed president Juan Velasco Alvarado. General Carlos Briceño, the Commander of the Peruvian Army, re-opened the investigation into Montesinos' alleged treason. Montesinos fled to Ecuador, where in 1984 he revealed information to the Ecuadorian Army about Peru's military weapons purchases. The investigation was closed that year in order to "protect institutional image", and Montesinos was allowed to return to Peru.

The Fujimori years
Montesinos came to public notice again in 1990 when he defended Alberto Fujimori against accusations of fraudulent real estate dealings, during the presidential campaign, in which Fujimori was an obscure candidate. The paperwork in the case disappeared and the charges were dropped. Gustavo Gorriti reported that Montesinos allegedly used $1 million provided by Pablo Escobar to fund the presidential campaign for Alberto Fujimori in the 1990 Peruvian general election. In addition, evidence exists that Montesinos reportedly forged tax documents and the birth certificate of Fujimori according to the Harvard International Review. After Fujimori won the 1990 general elections, on 28 July Montesinos became his chief advisor and the effective head of the National Intelligence Service (SIN). The Drug Enforcement Administration (DEA), according to its documents, believed in 1990 that Montesinos effectively ruled Peru through the SIN. The United States reportedly maintained a relationship with Montesinos as a way to have direct influence in Peru; the SIN head would clear bureaucratic obstacles and would immediately implement the recommendations of the CIA. During his years with Fujimori, Montesinos was said to be paid $1 million annually by the CIA from 1990 to 2000, according to US officials, while the CIA and the DEA defended him from allegations of misconduct.

Relationship with the United States 
While leading the SIN through the 1990s, Montesinos served the interests of the United States on multiple occasions according to the Harvard International Review. Monstesinos was directly involved with assisting American businesses establish deals in Peru, mediating US-led drug enforcement efforts in the Peruvian army and air force and obtaining money for US antinarcotics missions in Peru upon demand. 

One of his largest accomplishments for the United States was granting majority mining rights of the Yanacocha mine – the fourth largest gold mine in the world – to the US-based Newmont. French mining company Bureau de Recherches Géologiques et Minières discovered the Yanacocha, though Newmont sought majority rights to access the mine, raising a judicial dispute between the two. US Ambassador to Peru Dennis Jett told the Fujimori government that "any appearance of succumbing to French pressure would feed rumors of corruption in the Peruvian judicial system and thus scare off international investors", with Montesinos later telling a supreme court judge tasked with decision that if the decision was not in favor with Newmont, then the United States would not support Peru's territorial dispute with Ecuador from the Cenepa War. The Supreme Court ultimately decided 4-3 in favor of granting the rights to Newmont.

Political repression
The DEA documented in December 1990, that Montesinos utilized illegal surveillance acts both domestically and internationally.

Montesinos is widely accused of threatening or harassing Fujimori's political opponents. Evidence proves that he supervised a death squad known as the Grupo Colina, part of the National Intelligence Service, which was thought to have been responsible for the Barrios Altos massacre and the La Cantuta massacre, actions intended to repress the Shining Path (Sendero Luminoso), the major communist insurgency movement that had been operating since the 1980s, but only resulted in the execution of civilians.

Four officers who were tortured during interrogation after plotting a coup d'état against Fujimori in November 1992 later stated that Montesinos took an active part in torturing them.  On March 16, 1998, former Peruvian Army Intelligence Agent Luisa Zanatta accused Montesinos of ordering illegal wiretaps of leading politicians and journalists. Zanatta also said that army intelligence agents had killed fellow agent Mariella Barreto Riofano because she gave a magazine information about human rights violations, as well as the location of bodies from the La Cantuta massacre. Zanatta said that in early 1997, Barreto had told her that she was part of the Grupo Colina death squad responsible for the La Cantuta massacre. Barreto's dismembered body was found by a roadside on March 29, 1997, and showed evidence of torture before death and mutilation.

Control of the media
During the Fujimori years, Montesinos gained extensive control over the Peruvian media by bribing television channel executives. Bribes ranged from approximately US$500,000 per month to Channels 2 and 5 to $1.5 million per month to Channel 4. In total, Montesinos paid more than US$3 million per month in bribes to Peruvian television channels.

Montesinos funneled additional funds to the television channels through government advertising. From 1997 to 1999, the Peruvian government increased their advertising budget by 52%, becoming Peru's largest advertiser. Ultimately, Montesinos held editorial control over Peru's free-to-air television networks: Frecuencia Latina, América Televisión, Panamericana Televisión, ATV, and Red Global.

To maintain this control he structured bribe payments in monthly installments, limiting the risk of defection by the TV channel owners. He also ensured continued cooperation through blackmail, utilizing video evidence of sexual indiscretions by bribe recipients. To keep track of the numerous bribes and gain further evidence of the owners' complicity, which could also be used as blackmail, Montesinos filmed monetary exchanges and forced channel executives to sign contracts stipulating the extent of influence he expected in return for the stated monetary bribe.

The Fujimori government also controlled the content of Channel 7, Televisión Nacional de Peru, which was explicitly state owned. Canal N, remained the only independent television channel, funded entirely by monthly service fees. Montesinos did not bribe Canal N because of their low viewership, numbering in the tens of thousands, which was a result of the unaffordability of the monthly fees for most Peruvians. Canal N was the first network to air the Kouri videotape, which exposed the extent of Montesinos's corruption.

In April 1997, Baruch Ivcher's Frecuencia Latina, Channel 2, broadcast allegations by Peruvian Army Intelligence agent Leonor La Rosa that she was tortured by intelligence agents. (Her testimony was later brought into question.)

On July 14, 1997, the government legally stripped Ivcher, a native Israeli, of his Peruvian nationality for supposed offenses against the government. In September, control of Channel 2 was given to minority shareholders more sympathetic to the government. In response, former United Nations Secretary-General Javier Pérez de Cuéllar said, "Peru is no longer a democracy. We are now a country headed by an authoritarian regime."

2000 elections

The 2000 presidential elections, which followed years of political violence, was controversial.  A journalist claimed to have a videotape of Montesinos bribing election officials to fix the vote. He claimed to have been kidnapped by secret police agents, who sawed his arm to the bone to get him to give up the tape. In view of such tactics, the Clinton administration threatened briefly not to recognize Fujimori's victory. It backed off from this threat, and pressured Fujimori's government to take action to root out abuses, including ousting Montesinos.

Continuing political unrest in Peru would have represented a serious problem as US operations against the FARC in Colombia got under way. Peru was needed as a base of operations and a defensive backstop against guerrillas based in Colombia's south, not far from the Peruvian border.

Drug trafficking allegations
The DEA was aware of reports in August 1990 that Montesinos was involved with being paid for the immunity of drug traffickers.

Allegations circulated that Montesinos and General Nicolás Hermoza Ríos, the chairman of Peru's joint chiefs of staff, were taking protection money from drug traffickers. Documents that were later declassified by the US government showed that by 1996 the Drug Enforcement Administration (DEA) was aware of the allegations.  Despite evidence that Montesinos was in business with Colombian narco-traffickers, the CIA paid Montesinos's intelligence organization $1 million a year for 10 years to fight drug trafficking.

One of the most notorious scandals during this period was the 11 May 1996 seizure of 169–176 kg of cocaine (the quantity depends on the source) aboard a Peruvian Air Force Douglas DC-8 (frequently confused in the media as the presidential Boeing 737 as it had operated on this role until the acquisition of the Boeing) that was about to depart on a mission to Russia (with stopovers at the Canary Islands and Bordeaux), carrying military aviation equipment for maintenance. The scandal remains a mystery to this day because the drug's origin and destiny were never determined and the investigations were compromised by Fujimori's corrupt government and possibly Montesinos himself. A 2011 investigation revealed that some four drug shipments were made abroad, with Miami listed as a destination, in air force planes during 1993–1994. Only the material authors (several low-ranking officers) were processed, acquitted and publicly defended by Fujimori in late 1997 (amongst them Fujimori's aide-de-camp who was part of the plane's crew).

Peruvian drug kingpin Demetrio Chávez Peñaherrera, known as "El Vaticano", testified that Montesinos was a protector of drug trafficking. During a trial audience on August 16, 1996, Chávez Peñaherrera stated that he had bribed members of the Peruvian Armed Forces and Montesinos himself, as the effective chief of the Peruvian Intelligence Service (SIN), to be able to operate freely in Campanilla, a jungle area of the Huallaga region (where he operated an illegal airstrip). Recordings of radio communications presented during the trial showed that members of the army had let Chávez's organization operate freely in the Huallaga region in exchange for bribes. During a latter appearance in the court, Chávez appeared tortured and drugged, evidenced by his incoherent speaking. After sentencing, while in prison, Chávez talked to the press and revealed that Montesinos said to him at one point that he "did some work" with Pablo Escobar, leader of the Medellín Cartel.

Montesinos was paid US$50,000 a month during 1991 and 1992. As proof, the government presented recordings during Chávez's trial of radio communications between his drug traffickers and members of the Armed Forces attesting to bribery of Montesinos. In addition, Chávez said that retired general Nicolás de Bari Hermoza, the former chief of the Armed Forces Joint Command, and Fujimori had both complete knowledge of the illicit acts of Montesinos.

Downfall
Frequently, Montesinos secretly videotaped himself bribing individuals in his office, incriminating politicians, officials and military officers. His downfall appears to have been precipitated by the discovery of a major illegal arms shipment. Arranged by guerrilla leader Tomás Medina Caracas, the arms were airlifted from Jordan via Peru, to the FARC insurgent guerrillas in southern Colombia.

Montesinos claimed the credit for uncovering the arms smuggling, which involved upwards of 10,000 Kalashnikov assault rifles. Jordan rejected the Peruvian version of events, insisting the shipments were legitimate government-to-government deals. Evidence emerged which pointed to Montesinos having orchestrated the gun-running operation rather than dismantling it. A senior Peruvian general was found to have participated in the deal, and another principal participant was a government contractor. He had signed at least eleven deals with the Fujimori regime, most of them to provide supplies to the Peruvian military.

According to one report, a group of military officers angered by Montesinos's apparent role in the arms deal broke into his offices and stole the video that was subsequently broadcast. Because of the arms deal, Montesinos lost the support of the US, which attached high strategic importance to crushing the FARC.

Vladi-videos
On 14 September 2000, Peruvian television broadcast a video of Montesinos bribing an opposition congressman, Alberto Kouri, to support Perú 2000, Fujimori's party. The video caused Fujimori's remaining support to collapse. He accepted the resignation of Montesinos and thanked him for his services. He then announced the dissolution of the National Intelligence Service (SIN) and new elections, in which he would not run. Shortly thereafter, Montesinos sought political asylum in Panama.

In following months, some of the most infamous "Vladi-videos" were released. One showed the owners of Channel 2 being offered US$500,000 a month to ban appearances of the political opposition on their channel. Another showed Channel 4 owners getting $1.5 million a month for similar cooperation. Others show Montesinos counting out $350,000 in cash to Channel 5's proprietor, and the owner of Channel 9 receiving $50,000 to cancel an investigative series called SIN censura (Uncensored). In June 2001, through the assistance of the U.S. Government, Montesinos was turned over to the Venezuelan government in Caracas and extradited back to Peru. Then his trial began.

Trial
Montesinos was convicted of embezzlement, illegal assumption of his post as intelligence chief, abuse of power, influence peddling and bribery. Those charges carried sentences of between five and fifteen years each, but Peruvian prison sentences are served concurrently, so prosecutors continued to pursue him on additional charges. He was acquitted of two specific charges of corruption and conspiracy related to the mayor of Callao, whom he was alleged to have helped evade drug-trafficking charges. Montesinos was imprisoned at the Centro de Reclusión de Máxima Seguridad (CEREC) in Callao (which was built under his orders during the 1990s) and is serving 15 years in prison, but he will have to face at least 8 more trials in the next years. In total he was accused of sixty-three crimes that range from drug trafficking to murder.

Imprisonment 
In August 2004, U.S. officials returned to Peru $20 million in funds embezzled by Montesinos; it had been deposited in U.S. banks by two men working for him. Prime Minister Carlos Ferrero and other prosecutors believed that the total amount embezzled by Montesinos during his tenure at the National Intelligence Service surpassed one billion dollars, most of which was deposited in foreign banks.

In October 2004 Wilmer Yarleque Ordinola, 44, was apprehended in Virginia in the US and convicted of immigration fraud. He had been working as a construction laborer without papers. The Peruvian government sought his extradition as an alleged member of Montesino's Grupo Colina and responsible for 26-35 deaths or "disappearances" which the Truth and Reconciliation Commission (Peru) attributed to him. In October 2004 Yarleque was being held by the U.S. Marshals in Alexandria, Virginia.  The suspect was initially granted a writ of habeas corpus, as he argued that he could not be extradited for political offenses committed for the government, but the United States Court of Appeals for the Fourth Circuit reversed that decision in 2005, opening the way for his extradition.

Montesinos was sentenced in September 2006 to a 20-year prison term for his direct involvement in an illegal arms deal to provide 10,000 assault weapons to Colombian rebels. Tribunal judges made their ruling based on evidence that placed Montesinos at the center of an intricate web of negotiations designed to transport assault rifles from Jordan to the Revolutionary Armed Forces of Colombia FARC.

In 2007 Montesinos was on trial for allegedly ordering the extra-judicial killings of the hostage-takers from the left-wing Túpac Amaru Revolutionary Movement (MRTA) during the 1997 Japanese embassy hostage crisis. The former chief of the armed forces, and retired Colonel Roberto Huaman were also charged with ordering the extrajudicial execution of the 14 rebels. This action followed the government's commando raid in April to free the more than 70 diplomats who had been held hostage for more than four months in the Japanese embassy. The Peruvian special forces' recapture resulted in the deaths of one hostage, two commandos and all of the MRTA rebels. The former Japanese political attaché Hidetaka Ogura, one of the hostages freed from the Embassy, stated that he saw at least three of the MRTA rebels captured alive. Montesinos, Hermoza and Huaman were acquitted of those charges in 2012, as the court found that a chain of command linking the accused to the killings had not been proven.

In August 2012 Montesinos and the former chief of the Peruvian Air Force, Waldo Richter, were acquitted of drug trafficking for the 1996 Air Force plane case. He had been involved by a number of drug traffickers.

Vladi-audios 
Following the 2021 Peruvian general election, audio recordings deemed Vladi-audios were leaked revealing that Montesinos was allegedly involved in at least 17 landline phone calls while imprisoned at the CEREC maximum security prison in an effort to prevent leftist presidential candidate Pedro Castillo from entering office and to protect Keiko Fujimori from being imprisoned. In one reported audio, Montesinos mentions a first plan to have Fujimori's husband to go to the United States embassy in Lima to present "documentation of the fraud" to the Office of Regional Affairs and Central Intelligence Agency, with Montesinos allegedly saying he already contacted the embassy, that the documents would reach President Joe Biden and that his administration would condemn the election as interference from Cuba, Nicaragua, and Venezuela, subsequently giving Fujimori's claims of fraud more weight. In other reported audios, Montesinos suggests to retired military officer and Popular Force member Pedro Rejas Tataje on 10 June 2021 that they should bribe three electoral magistrates of the National Jury of Elections (JNE) – who were tasked with reviewing the narrow and controversial election – with one million dollars each, telling the former officer to contact attorney Guillermo Sendón who then reportedly made contact with JNE magistrate Luis Arce. The next day on 11 June, the JNE extended the deadline to file complaints to annul the election despite the maximum deadline already passing. Following the leak of the audios, Pedro Rejas Tataje released additional recording saying that he collected them as he believed that Montesinos was participating in illegal activities. Rejas would later explain that he believed Montesinos was directly involved with the campaign of Keiko Fujimori.

Right-wing politicians in Peru downplayed the audios of Montesinos. According to IDL-Reporteros, the Navy of Peru was involved in a "lie" when issuing their joint statement, saying that Montesinos was only involved in two phone calls, with IDL asking "How could you not notice the 17 calls and 12 conversations at CEREC, at the Naval Base of the institution with the greatest development in electronic intelligence within the Armed Forces?". The Ministry of Defense opened an investigation of the matter and on 25 August 2021, President Pedro Castillo announced that Montesinos had been transferred to the Ancon II prison to serve the remaining of his sentence while four officers were replaced at the naval prison.

See also 

 Plan Verde

Notes

External links
 "Army Played 'A Key Role' In Departure Of Fujimori, Intelligence Service Scandals Rankled Peruvian Military" (Washington Post September 18, 2000)
 "Bribes, Lies, and Videotape in Peru" (Business Week February 2, 2001)
 "CIA Gave $10 Million to Peru's Ex-Spymaster Montesinos" (July 18, 2001)
 Declassified United States NSA documents about Montesinos
 Profile of Vladimiro Montesinos (desaparecidos.org)
 "How to Subvert Democracy: Montesinos in Peru" (by John McMillan and Pablo Zoido, March 2004)
 "Montesinos, Fujimori, Toledo and Peru's future"
 "Peru, the disintegration of the Fujimori regime" (World Socialist website)
 "The Betrayal of Peru's Democracy: Montesinos as Fujimori's Svengali" (Covert Action Quarterly, Summer 1994)
 "'The Doctor' Divided U.S. Officials, CIA Defended Peruvian Against Human-Rights Accusations" (Washington Post, September 22, 2000)
 Montesinos: The end of the road (BBC News, 24 June 2001)
 "The Meaning of Montesinos"
 "The Spy who would rule Peru"
 "Videomania" (the Economist, February 8, 2001)
 "Borron y Manchas Nuevas: Documentos de inteligencia norteamericanos sobre Montesinos"  (Caretas) (in Spanish)
"Montesinos's Web", PBS FRONTLINE/World October 2005. View streaming video of recordings secretly made by former Peruvian intelligence chief Vladimir Montesinos of the CIA station chief, a Peruvian Supreme Court judge and a high-ranking executive of a major U.S. mining company, the documentary itself, as well as Web exclusive features, interview transcripts, FOIA documents and a "gallery of players" involved in the protracted legal dispute over Yanacocha, one of the richest gold mines in the world.

1946 births
Peruvian Army officers
Corruption in Peru
Fujimorista politicians
Living people
National University of San Marcos alumni
People from Arequipa
Peruvian prisoners and detainees
Prisoners and detainees of Peru
Peruvian people of Greek descent
Peruvian drug traffickers
People convicted of spying for the United States
Prisoners in San Lorenzo Island
Peruvian politicians convicted of crimes